The 2015–16 Providence Friars women's basketball team will represent Providence College in the 2015–16 college basketball season. The Friars, led by fourth year head coach Susan Robinson Fruchtl and are members of the Big East Conference. The Friars will play their home games at Alumni Hall. They finished the season 5–24, 1–17 in Big East play to finish in last place. They lost in the first round of the Big East women's tournament to Creighton.

Roster

Schedule

|-
!colspan=9 style="background:#000000; color:#C0C0C0;"| Non-conference regular season

|-
!colspan=9 style="background:#000000; color:#C0C0C0;"| Big East regular season

|-
!colspan=9 style="background:#000000; color:#C0C0C0;"| Big East Women's Tournament

See also
 2015–16 Providence Friars men's basketball team

References

Providence
Providence Friars women's basketball seasons
Provide
Provide